The 1958 Army Cadets football team represented the United States Military Academy in the 1958 NCAA University Division football season. Led by head coach Earl Blaik, the team finished with an undefeated 8–0–1 season. The Cadets' offense scored 264 points, while the defense allowed 49 points. At season's end, the team was third in the national rankings.

Schedule

Personnel

Game summaries

Notre Dame

Army's last win versus Notre Dame to date.

Navy
In the annual Army-Navy Game, on November 29 in Philadelphia, Army beat Navy by a score of 22–6.

Team players drafted into the NFL

Awards and honors
 Pete Dawkins, Heisman Trophy
 Pete Dawkins, Maxwell Award

References

Army
Army Black Knights football seasons
Lambert-Meadowlands Trophy seasons
College football undefeated seasons
Army Cadets football